Fußball ist unser Leben (German for "football is our life") is a German football (soccer) drama/comedy movie, centering on supporters of FC Schalke 04.

Plot
Hans Pollak (Ochsenknecht) is a hard core fan of Schalke 04. Together with his best friend Mike (Richter), he is member of the fanclub "Dios Knappen Gelsenkirchen", named after their idol, the (fictional) Schalke star player Pablo Di Ospeo. Pollak is so single-minded that he neglects the birth of his second child to watch his favorite club, and takes his family and girlfriend for granted.

One day, Pollak decides to bet his house that Di Ospeo will score in the next game. He is shocked to see that his idol is addicted to cocaine, abducts him and chains him into his room to make him quit cold turkey. Then, Pollak's neglected girlfriend has an affair and Pollak's mother dies of a coronary; Di Ospeo has tried to rescue her but could not reach her because he was shackled. Desperate Pollak decides to hang himself so that his family — he assumes that his house is lost — will at least get his life insurance. But his friends save him from the gallows with a Schalke flag, and a rehabilitated Di Ospeo scores the winning goal in the next game. Having won the bet after all, Pollak keeps his house and makes up with his girlfriend.

Guest roles
Many persons related to Schalke 04 have guest roles. Manager Rudi Assauer, coach Huub Stevens, player Yves Eigenrauch, masseur  and ex-coach Helmut Schulte have cameos, just like prominent fans like reporter , radio commentator  and disc jockey Dirk Oberschulte-Beckmann.

Awards
 Bavarian Film Awards: Uwe Ochsenknecht (best actor) and Marita Marschall (best supporting actress)
 German Film Awards: Uwe Ochsenknecht (best actor)

Footnotes

External links
 
 Official site

2000 films
1990s German-language films
German association football films
Films about kidnapping
Football mass media in Germany
1990s German films
2000s German films